Sony Urban Music was a division of Sony BMG, active from 2004 to 2006, The division handled R&B, soul, and hip hop releases by artists nominally signed to Sony's Columbia and Epic labels. During its existence, Sony Urban managed releases by artists such as Bow Wow, John Legend, Omarion, Bossman, DMX, Beyoncé, Amerie, Keshia Chanté and contemporary Christian music duo Anointed.

In March 2004, the division's general manager became Lisa Ellis, and president in 2005.

In November 2006, it was announced that Sony Urban Music would be terminated. The division was placed under the umbrella of the Columbia Records label. All of the artists handled by Sony Urban were returned to either Columbia or Epic, with a handful of exceptions. R&B singer Omarion switched from Epic to Columbia, where he recorded a duets album with rapper Bow Wow. New signees Sa-Ra, signed to Columbia through Kanye West's G.O.O.D. Music imprint, negotiated their release during the restructuring.

Albums 
U Gotta Feel Me (Lil' Flip): 2004
Destiny Fulfilled (Destiny's Child): 2004 
Time to Share (Toshinobu Kubota): 2004
Weapons of Mass Destruction (Xzibit): 2004
Get Lifted (John Legend): 2004
Lyfe 268-192 (Lyfe Jennings): 2004
Touch (Amerie): 2005
O (Omarion): 2005
Most Known Unknown (Three 6 Mafia): 2005
Most Known Hits (Three 6 Mafia): 2005
B'Day (Beyoncé): 2006
The Phoenix (Lyfe Jennings): 2006
Cash on Delivery (Ray Cash): 2006
Year of the Dog... Again (DMX): 2006
Once Again (John Legend): 2006
Crook By Da Book: The Fed Story (Project Pat): 2006
21 (Omarion): 2006
2U (Keshia Chanté): 2006
Don't Quit Your Day Job! (Consequence): 2007

References 

Defunct record labels of the United States
Record labels established in 2004
Record labels disestablished in 2006
Sony BMG